Applied Nanoscience is a science journal that publishes original articles on Nanotechnology. It caters to areas fundamental to building sustainable progress, including water science, advanced materials, energy, electronics, environmental science and medicine.

Abstracting and indexing
The journal is indexed in the following databases:

Astrophysics Data System (ADS)
CNKI
Chemical Abstracts Service (CAS)
Current Contents/Physical, Chemical and Earth Sciences
Dimensions
EBSCO Applied Science & Technology Source
EBSCO Discovery Service
EBSCO STM Source
EI Compendex
Google Scholar
INIS Atomindex
Institute of Scientific and Technical Information of China
Japanese Science and Technology Agency (JST)
Journal Citation Reports/Science Edition
Naver
OCLC WorldCat Discovery Service
ProQuest Central
ProQuest Engineering
ProQuest Materials Science and Engineering Database
ProQuest SciTech Premium Collection
ProQuest Technology Collection
ProQuest-ExLibris Primo
ProQuest-ExLibris Summon
SCImago
SCOPUS
Science Citation Index Expanded (SciSearch)
Semantic Scholar
TD Net Discovery Service
UGC-CARE List (India)
WTI Frankfurt eG

References 

Nanotechnology journals
Chemistry journals